Touré Kunda is a Senegalese band, noted for their musical versatility and political activism. Their 40-year career encompasses recordings in over six languages and collaborations with well-known musicians such as Carlos Santana and Talking Heads. They have had considerable success in Africa and Europe and are active in social causes such as children's rights and advocates for the homeless.

Biography
Born twenty-two days apart in 1950 in Ziguinchor in Casamance, Senegal, Ismaïla and Sixu Tidiane Touré were introduced to music by their elder brother Amadou, a singer and musician.

They moved to Paris, France, in 1979 to complete their musical education. They worked their way up in the Parisian scene. The group sings in Soninké, Wolof, Fula, Mandingo, Diola, and Portuguese creole, reflecting the multilingual mixture of the people of Casamance.

Their first album, Ismaïla do Sixu, was released in 1979. It was followed by É'mma Africa in 1980 and Touré Kunda in 1981. In 1985, following the death of their brother and mentor Amadou, Ismael and Sixu Tidiane toured throughout Africa.

Upon returning to France, they found considerable success and critical acclaim among the French music press. In 1992, they were invited to play for Nelson Mandela at the Courtyard of Human Rights.

In 1999, their album Légendes, a retrospective of their 20-year career, was released. Shortly thereafter, they participated in Carlos Santana's album  Supernatural and toured with him. A greatest hits album, Best Of, was released in 2006. Another album, Santhiaba, came out in 2008.

Ismaïla and Sixu Tidiane Touré are members of the sponsoring committee of the United Nations' Decade for the Promotion of a Culture of Peace and Non-Violence for the Children of the World.

On 27 February 2023, Ismaïla died in Paris, France, at the age of 73.

Discography
 1980: É'mma Africa
 1981: Touré Kunda
 1983: Amadou Tilo
 1984: Casamance au clair de lune (Toure Kunda - distribution: Wagram Music)
 1984: Paris Ziguinchor (Live) (Toure Kunda - distribution: Wagram Music)
 1985: Natalia
 1986: Toubab Bi (Toure Kunda - distribution: Wagram Music)
 1987: Best of Touré Kunda (Toure Kunda - distribution: Wagram Music)
 1988: Karadindi
 1990: Salam
 1991: Sounké (Live)
 1992: Sili Beto
 1996: Mouslai (Toure Kunda - distribution: Wagram Music)
 1996: The Touré Kunda Collection (Putumayo World Music)
 1999: Légende (Compilation, Sony)
 2000: Terra Saabi (Toure Kunda - distribution: Wagram Music)
 2008: Santhiaba (Toure Kunda - distribution: Wagram Music)
 2018: Lambi Golo

See also
Music of Senegal

References

Bibliography
 Nathalie Steinberg, Touré Kunda, Paris, Encre, 1985

External links
 Official site
 Biography at RFI Musique
 
 

Senegalese musical groups
Family musical groups